Valeri Viktorovich Stolyarov; born January 18, 1971) was a former Russian nordic combined skier who competed during the late 1990s and early 2000s.

He won a bronze in the 15 km individual at the 1998 Winter Olympics in Nagano. Stolyarov also won a bronze medal in the 4 x 5 km team event at the 1999 FIS Nordic World Ski Championships in Ramsau.

External links
 
 

Russian male Nordic combined skiers
Olympic Nordic combined skiers of the Unified Team
Soviet male Nordic combined skiers
Olympic Nordic combined skiers of Russia
Nordic combined skiers at the 1992 Winter Olympics
Nordic combined skiers at the 1994 Winter Olympics
Nordic combined skiers at the 1998 Winter Olympics
Olympic bronze medalists for Russia
1971 births
Living people
Olympic medalists in Nordic combined
FIS Nordic World Ski Championships medalists in Nordic combined
Medalists at the 1998 Winter Olympics